George Robert Newhart (born September 5, 1929) is an American actor and comedian. He is known for his deadpan and stammering delivery style. Having started performing as a standup comedian, he transitioned his career acting in television. He has received numerous accolades including three Grammy Awards, an Emmy Award, and a Golden Globe Award. He was honored with the Mark Twain Prize for American Humor in 2002. 

Newhart came to prominence in 1960 when his album of comedic monologues, The Button-Down Mind of Bob Newhart, became a bestseller and reached number one on the Billboard pop album chart; it remains the 20th-best-selling comedy album in history. The follow-up album, The Button-Down Mind Strikes Back!, was also a success, and the two albums held the Billboard number one and number two spots simultaneously.

Newhart later went into acting, starring as Chicago psychologist Robert Hartley in The Bob Newhart Show from 1972 to 1978, and then as Vermont innkeeper Dick Loudon on series Newhart from 1982 to 1990. He also had two short-lived sitcoms in the 1990s, Bob and George and Leo. Newhart had film roles such as Major Major in Catch-22 and Papa Elf in Elf. He provided the voice of Bernard in the Disney animated films The Rescuers and The Rescuers Down Under. In 2004, he played the library head Judson in The Librarian, a character that continued in 2014 on the TV series The Librarians. In 2013, Newhart made the first of his six guest appearances on The Big Bang Theory as Professor Proton, for which he received his first Primetime Emmy Award.

Early life
Newhart was born on September 5, 1929, at West Suburban Hospital in Oak Park, Illinois. His parents were Julia Pauline (née Burns; 1900–1994), a housewife, and George David Newhart (1900–1985), a part-owner of a plumbing and heating-supply business. His mother was of Irish descent, his father was of German and Irish descent. The name, Newhart, is German. One of his grandmothers was from St. Catharines, Ontario, Canada.

Newhart was educated at Roman Catholic schools in the Chicago area, including St. Catherine of Siena Grammar School in Oak Park, and attended St. Ignatius College Prep (high school), graduating in 1947. He then enrolled at Loyola University Chicago from which he graduated in 1952 with a bachelor's degree in business management. Newhart was drafted into the United States Army and served in the United States during the Korean War as a personnel manager until being discharged in 1954. He briefly attended Loyola University Chicago School of Law, but did not complete a degree, in part, he says, because he was asked to behave unethically during an internship.

Career
After the war, Newhart worked for United States Gypsum as an accountant. He later said that his motto, "That's close enough", and his habit of adjusting petty cash imbalances with his own money showed he did not have the temperament to be an accountant.

Early career
In 1958, Newhart became an advertising copywriter for Fred A. Niles, a major independent film and television producer in Chicago. There, he and a co-worker entertained each other with long telephone calls about absurd scenarios, which they later recorded and sent to radio stations as audition tapes. When the co-worker ended his participation by taking a job in New York, Newhart continued the recordings alone, developing this type of routine.

Dan Sorkin, a disc jockey at a radio station who later became the announcer-sidekick on Newhart's NBC series, introduced Newhart to the head of talent at Warner Bros. Records. The label signed him in 1959, only a year after it was formed, based solely on those recordings. Newhart expanded his material into a stand-up routine he began to perform at nightclubs.

Comedy albums
Newhart became famous mostly on the strength of his audio releases, in which he played a solo "straight man". Newhart's routine was to portray one end of a conversation (usually a phone call), playing the comedic straight man and implying what the other person was saying.

His 1960 comedy album The Button-Down Mind of Bob Newhart was the first comedy album to make number one on the Billboard charts. It won the 1961 Grammy Award for Album of the Year and peaked at number two in the UK Albums Chart. Newhart also won Best New Artist.

Newhart told a 2005 interviewer for PBS's American Masters that his favorite stand-up routine is "Abe Lincoln vs. Madison Avenue", which appears on this album. In the routine, a slick promoter has to deal with Lincoln's reluctance to agree to efforts to boost his image. Chicago TV director and future comedian Bill Daily, who was Newhart's castmate on The Bob Newhart Show, suggested the routine to him. Newhart became known for an intentional stammer, in service to his unique combination of politeness and disbelief at what he was supposedly hearing. Newhart has used the delivery throughout his career.

A follow-up album, The Button-Down Mind Strikes Back, was released six months later and won Best Comedy Performance – Spoken Word that year. Subsequent comedy albums include Behind the Button-Down Mind of Bob Newhart (1961), The Button-Down Mind on TV (1962), Bob Newhart Faces Bob Newhart (1964), The Windmills Are Weakening (1965), This Is It (1967), Best of Bob Newhart (1971), and Very Funny Bob Newhart (1973). Years later, he released Bob Newhart Off the Record (1992), The Button-Down Concert (1997), and Something Like This (2001), an anthology of his 1960s Warner Bros. albums.

On December 10, 2015, publicist and comedy album collector Jeff Abraham revealed that a "lost" Newhart track from 1965 about Paul Revere existed on a one-of-a-kind acetate, which he owns. The track made its world premiere on episode 163 of the Comedy on Vinyl podcast.

Television
Newhart's success in stand-up led to his own short-lived NBC variety show in 1961, The Bob Newhart Show. The show lasted only a single season, but it earned Newhart a Primetime Emmy Award nomination and a Peabody Award. The Peabody Board cited him as:

In the mid-1960s, Newhart was one of the initial three co-hosts of the variety show The Entertainers (1964), with Carol Burnett and Caterina Valente, appeared on The Dean Martin Show 24 times and on The Ed Sullivan Show eight times. He appeared in a 1963 episode of The Alfred Hitchcock Hour, "How to Get Rid of Your Wife"; and on The Judy Garland Show. Newhart guest-hosted The Tonight Show Starring Johnny Carson 87 times, and hosted Saturday Night Live twice, in 1980 and 1995. In 1964, he appeared at the Royal Variety Performance in London, before Queen Elizabeth II.

In addition to stand-up comedy, Newhart became a dedicated character actor. This led to other series, such as Bob Hope Presents the Chrysler Theatre, Captain Nice, two episodes of Insight, and It's Garry Shandling's Show. He reprised his role as Dr. Bob Hartley on Murphy Brown, appeared as himself on The Simpsons, and played a retired forensic pathologist on NCIS.

Newhart guest-starred on three episodes of ER, for which he was nominated for a Primetime Emmy Award, as well as on Desperate Housewives and a role on NCIS as Ducky's mentor and predecessor, who was discovered to have Alzheimer's disease. In 2013, he also appeared on Committed and in an episode of the sixth season of The Big Bang Theory, for which he was awarded a Primetime Emmy Award, and which led to subsequent appearances in its seventh, ninth, and eleventh seasons.

Films
Although primarily a television star, Newhart has been in a number of popular films, beginning with the 1962 war story Hell Is for Heroes. In 1968, Newhart played an annoying software specialist in the film Hot Millions. His films include 1970's Alan Jay Lerner musical On a Clear Day You Can See Forever, the 1971 Norman Lear comedy Cold Turkey, Mike Nichols's war satire Catch 22, the 1977 Disney animated feature The Rescuers and its 1990 sequel The Rescuers Down Under as the voice of Bernard, and the Will Ferrell holiday comedy Elf (2003).

Newhart played the President of the United States in the comedy First Family (1980). He appeared as a beleaguered school principal in In & Out (1997). He made a cameo appearance as a sadistic but appreciative CEO at the end of the comedy Horrible Bosses (2011).

Sitcoms

The Bob Newhart Show

Newhart starred in two long-running sitcoms. In 1972, soon after he guest-starred on The Smothers Brothers Comedy Hour, he was approached by his agent and his managers, producer Grant Tinker, and actress Mary Tyler Moore (the husband/wife team who founded MTM Enterprises), to work on a series called The Bob Newhart Show, to be written by David Davis and Lorenzo Music. He was very interested in the starring role of psychologist Bob Hartley, with Suzanne Pleshette playing his wry, loving wife, Emily, and Bill Daily as neighbor and friend Howard Borden.

The Bob Newhart Show faced heavy competition from the beginning, launching at the same time as the popular shows M*A*S*H, Maude, Sanford And Son, and The Waltons. Nevertheless, it was an immediate hit. The show eventually referenced what made Newhart's name in the first place; apart from the first few episodes, it used an opening-credits sequence featuring Newhart answering a telephone in his office. According to co-star Marcia Wallace, the entire cast got along well, and Newhart became close friends with both Wallace and co-star Suzanne Pleshette.

In addition to Wallace as Bob's wisecracking, man-chasing receptionist Carol Kester, the cast included Peter Bonerz as amiable orthodontist Jerry Robinson; Jack Riley as Elliot Carlin, the most misanthropic of Hartley's patients; character actor and voice artist John Fiedler as milquetoast Emil Petersen; and Pat Finley as Bob's sister, Ellen Hartley, a love interest for Howard Borden. Future Newhart regular Tom Poston had a briefly recurring role as Cliff "Peeper" Murdock, veteran stage actor Barnard Hughes appeared as Bob's father for three episodes spread over two seasons, and Martha Scott appeared in several episodes as Bob's mother.

By 1977, the show's ratings were declining and Newhart wanted to end it, but was under contract to do one more season. The show's writers tried to rework the sitcom by adding a pregnancy, but Newhart objected: "I told the creators I didn't want any children, because I didn't want it to be a show about 'How stupid Daddy is, but we love him so much, let's get him out of the trouble he's gotten himself into'." Nevertheless, the staff wrote an episode that they hoped would change Newhart's mind. Newhart read the script and he agreed it was very funny. He then asked, "Who are you going to get to play Bob?" Coincidentally, Newhart's wife gave birth to their daughter Jenny late in the year, which caused him to miss several episodes.

In the last episode of the fifth season, not only was Bob's wife, Emily, pregnant, but his receptionist, Carol, was, too. In the first show of the sixth season, Bob revealed his dream of the pregnancies and that neither Emily nor Carol was really pregnant.

Marcia Wallace spoke of Newhart's amiable nature on set: 
He's very low key, and he didn't want to cause trouble. I had a dog by the name of Maggie that I used to bring to the set. And whenever there was a line that Bob didn't like—he didn't want to complain too much—so, he'd go over, get down on his hands and knees, and repeat the line to the dog, which invariably yawned; and he'd say, "See, I told you it's not funny!"
Wallace also commented on the show's lack of Emmy recognition: "People think we were nominated for many an Emmy, people presume we won Emmys, all of us, and certainly Bob, and certainly the show. Nope, never!"

Newhart discontinued the series in 1978 after six seasons and 142 episodes. Wallace said of its ending, "It was much crying and sobbing. It was so sad. We really did get along. We really had great times together." 

Of Newhart's other long-running sitcom, Newhart, Wallace said:
But some of the other great comedic talents who had a brilliant show, when they tried to do it twice, it didn't always work. And that's what... but like Bob, as far as I'm concerned, Bob is like the Fred Astaire of comics. He just makes it look so easy, and he's not as in-your-face as some might be. And so, you just kind of take it for granted, how extraordinarily funny and how he wears well.
She was later reunited with Newhart twice, once in a reprise of her role as Carol on Murphy Brown in 1994, and on an episode of Newhart's short-lived sitcom, George & Leo, in 1997.

Newhart
By 1982, Newhart was interested in a new sitcom. After he had discussions with Barry Kemp and CBS, the show Newhart was created, in which Newhart played Vermont innkeeper and TV talk show host Dick Loudon. Mary Frann was cast as his wife, Joanna. Jennifer Holmes was originally cast as Leslie Vanderkellen, but left after former daytime soap star Julia Duffy joined the cast as Dick's inn maid and spoiled rich girl, Stephanie Vanderkellen. Peter Scolari (who had been a fan of Newhart's since he was 17) was also cast as Dick's manipulative TV producer, Michael Harris, in six of the eight seasons. Character actor Tom Poston played the role of handyman George Utley, earning three Primetime Emmy Award nominations as Outstanding Supporting Actor in a Comedy Series in 1984, 1986, and 1987. Like The Bob Newhart Show, Newhart was an immediate hit, and again, like the show before it, it was also nominated for Primetime Emmy Awards but failed to win any. During the time Newhart was working on the show, in 1985, his smoking habit finally caught up to him, and he was taken to the emergency room for secondary polycythemia. The doctors ordered him to stop smoking.

In 1987, ratings began to drop. Newhart ended in 1990 after eight seasons and 182 episodes. The last episode ended with a scene in which Newhart wakes up in bed with Suzanne Pleshette, who played Emily, his wife from The Bob Newhart Show. He realizes (in a satire of a famous plot element in the television series Dallas a few years earlier) that the entire eight-year Newhart series had been a single nightmare of Dr. Bob Hartley's, which Emily attributes to eating Japanese food before he went to bed. Recalling Mary Frann's buxom figure and proclivity for wearing sweaters, Bob closes the segment and the series by telling Emily, "You really should wear more sweaters" before the typical closing notes of the old Bob Newhart Show theme played over the fadeout. The twist ending was later chosen by TV Guide as the best finale in television history.

Bob and George & Leo

In 1992, Newhart returned to television with a series called Bob, about a cartoonist. An ensemble cast included Lisa Kudrow, but the show did not develop a strong audience and was cancelled shortly after the start of its second season, despite good critical reviews. On The Tonight Show following the cancellation, Newhart joked he had now done shows called The Bob Newhart Show, Newhart and Bob so his next show was going to be called The.

In 1997, Newhart returned again with George & Leo on CBS with Judd Hirsch and Jason Bateman (Newhart's first name being George); the show was cancelled during its first season.

Other TV appearances
In 1995, Newhart was approached by Showtime to make the first comedy special of his 35-year career, Off The Record, which consisted of him performing material from his first and second albums in front of an audience in Pasadena, California. In 2003, Newhart guest-starred on three episodes of ER in a rare dramatic role that earned him a Primetime Emmy Award nomination, his first in nearly 20 years. In 2005, he began a recurring role in Desperate Housewives as Morty, the on-again/off-again boyfriend of Sophie (Lesley Ann Warren), Susan Mayer's (Teri Hatcher) mother. In 2009, he received another Primetime Emmy nomination for reprising his role as Judson in The Librarian: Curse of the Judas Chalice.

On August 27, 2006, at the 58th Primetime Emmy Awards, hosted by Conan O'Brien, Newhart was placed in a supposedly airtight glass prison that contained three hours of air. If the Emmys went over the time of three hours, he would die. This gag was an acknowledgment of the common frustration that award shows usually run on past their allotted time (usually three hours). Newhart "survived" his containment to help O'Brien present the award for Outstanding Comedy Series (which went to The Office).

During an episode of Jimmy Kimmel Live!, Newhart made a comedic cameo with members of ABC's show Lost lampooning an alternate ending to the series finale. In 2011, he appeared in a small but pivotal role as a doctor in Lifetime's anthology film on breast cancer Five. In 2013 he made a guest appearance on The Big Bang Theory as the aged Professor Proton (Arthur Jeffries), a former science TV show host turned children's party entertainer, for which he won the Primetime Emmy Award for Outstanding Guest Actor in a Comedy Series. It was Newhart's first Emmy. At that year's Emmy ceremony, Newhart appeared as a presenter with The Big Bang Theory star Jim Parsons and received a standing ovation. He continued to play the character periodically through the show's 12th and final season and on its spinoff Young Sheldon.

On December 19, 2014, Newhart made a surprise appearance on the final episode of The Late Late Show with Craig Ferguson, where he was revealed to be the person inside Secretariat, Ferguson's on-set pantomime horse. The show then ended with a scene parodying the Newhart series finale, with Ferguson and Drew Carey reprising their roles from The Drew Carey Show. In June 2015, Newhart appeared on another series finale, that of Hot in Cleveland, playing the father-in-law of Joy Scroggs (Jane Leeves). It marked a reunion with Betty White, who was a cast member during the second season of Bob 23 years earlier. The finale ends with their characters getting married.

Comedic style
Newhart is known for his deadpan delivery and a slight stammer that he incorporated early on into the persona around which he built a successful career. On his TV shows, although he got his share of funny lines, he worked often in the Jack Benny tradition of being the "straight man" while the sometimes rather bizarre cast members surrounding him got the laughs. But Newhart has said, "I was not influenced by Jack Benny", and cites George Gobel and Bob and Ray as his initial writing and performance inspirations.

Several of his routines involve hearing half of a conversation as he speaks to someone on the phone. In a bit called "King Kong", a rookie security guard at the Empire State Building seeks guidance as to how to deal with an ape that is "between 18 and 19 stories high, depending on whether there's a 13th floor or not." He assures his boss he has looked in the guards' manual "under 'ape' and 'ape's toes'." Other famous routines include "The Driving Instructor", "The Mrs. Grace L. Ferguson Airline (and Storm Door Company)", "Introducing Tobacco to Civilization", "Abe Lincoln vs. Madison Avenue", "Defusing a Bomb" (in which an uneasy police chief tries to walk a new and nervous patrolman through defusing a live shell discovered on a beach), "The Retirement Party", "Ledge Psychology", "The Krushchev Landing Rehearsal", and "A Friend With a Dog."

In a 2012 podcast interview with Marc Maron, comedian Shelley Berman accused Newhart of plagiarizing his improvisational telephone routine style (although not any actual material of Berman's). But in interviews both years before and after Berman's comments, Newhart has never taken credit for originating the telephone concept, which he has noted was done earlier by Berman andpredating BermanNichols and May, George Jessel (in his well-known sketch "Hello Mama"), and in the 1913 recording "Cohen on the Telephone". Starting in the 1940s, Arlene Harris also built a long radio and TV career around her one-sided telephone conversations, and the technique was later also used by Lily Tomlin, Ellen DeGeneres, and others.

Filmography

Film

Television

Discography

Live albums 
 The Button-Down Mind of Bob Newhart (Warner Bros. Records, 1960)
 The Button-Down Mind Strikes Back (Warner Bros. Records, 1960)
 Behind the Button-Down Mind of Bob Newhart (Warner Bros. Records, 1961)
 The Button-Down Mind On TV (Warner Bros. Records, 1962)
 Bob Newhart Faces Bob Newhart (Warner Bros. Records, 1964)
 The Windmills are Weakening (Warner Bros. Records, 1965)
 This is It! (Warner Bros. Records, 1967)
Button-Down Concert (Nick at Nite Records, 1997)

Compilation albums 
 Masters (Warner Bros. Records, 1973)
 Bob Newhart (Pickwick Super Stars, 1980)
 Something Like This...: The Bob Newhart Anthology (Warner Bros./Rhino, 2001)

Bibliography
On September 20, 2006, Hyperion Books released Newhart's first book I Shouldn't Even Be Doing This. The book is primarily a memoir but also features comic bits. Transcripts of many of Newhart's classic routines are woven into the text. Actor David Hyde Pierce said, "The only difference between Bob Newhart on stage and Bob Newhart offstage is that there is no stage."

Awards and nominations

Grammy Awards

Primetime Emmy Awards

Golden Globe Awards

Honors 
 In 1993, Newhart was inducted into the Academy of Television Arts & Sciences Hall of Fame.
 In 1996, Newhart was ranked number 17 on TV Guide's "50 Greatest TV Stars of All Time" list. 
 In 1998, Billboard recognized Newhart's first album as number 20 on their list of most popular albums of the past 40 years, and the only comedy album on the list.
 On January 6, 1999, Newhart received a star on the Hollywood Walk of Fame for his contribution to television.
 In 2002, Newhart won the Mark Twain Prize for American Humor.
 In 2004, Newhart was named number 14 on "Comedy Central Presents: 100 Greatest Stand-Ups of All Time".
 On July 27, 2004, American cable television network TV Land unveiled a life-sized statue of Newhart as Hartley on the Magnificent Mile, at 430 N. Michigan Ave. where Hartley's office was in the opening credits. On November 1, 2004, the statue was permanently moved to the sculpture park in front of Chicago's Navy Pier entertainment complex. 
 On October 17, 2012, Loyola University Chicago honored him by naming their new theatre the Newhart Family Theatre.
 On February 20, 2015, Newhart was honored with the Publicists of the International Cinematographers Guild Lifetime Achievement Award.

Personal life

Family life 
Buddy Hackett introduced Newhart to Virginia "Ginnie" Quinn, daughter of character actor Bill Quinn. They were married on January 12, 1963. The couple have four children (Robert, Timothy, Jennifer, and Courtney) and ten grandchildren. They are Roman Catholic and raised their children as such. He is a member of the Church of the Good Shepherd and the related Catholic Motion Picture Guild in Beverly Hills, California.

Health 
In 1985, Newhart was hospitalized, suffering from secondary polycythemia, after years of heavy smoking. He recovered after several weeks and has since quit smoking.

Interests and investment 
In 1995, Newhart was one of several investors in Rotijefco (a blend of his children's names), which bought radio station KKSB (AM 1290 kHz) in Santa Barbara, California. Its format was changed to adult standards and its callsign to KZBN (his initials). In 2005, Rotijefco sold the station to Santa Barbara Broadcasting, which changed its callsign to KZSB and format to news and talk radio.

Newhart was an early home-computer hobbyist, purchasing the Commodore PET after its 1977 introduction. In 2001, he wrote "Later, I moved up to the 64 KB model and thought that was silly because it was more memory than I would ever possibly need."

Home 
For over 25 years, Newhart's family lived in a Wallace Neff–designed French Country–style mansion in Bel Air. The 9,169-square-foot, five-bedroom home featured formal gardens, a lagoon-style pool with waterfall, and guest apartment. Newhart sold the property to developers in May 2016 for $14.5 million.

The new property owners razed the ground and sold the now-empty 1.37-acre lot for $17.65 million in 2017.

References

Further reading

External links

 
 
  in 2001
 Bob Newhart profile from American Masters
 
 Bob:The Last Interview
 Bob Newhart four-part interview with Horace J. Digby on A3Radio
 Newhart turns 90, Standard-Examiner, accessed August 30, 2019

1929 births
Living people
20th-century American comedians
20th-century American male actors
21st-century American comedians
21st-century American male actors
Actors from Oak Park, Illinois
American copywriters
American male comedians
American male comedy actors
American male film actors
American male television actors
American male voice actors
American people of Canadian descent
American people of German descent
American people of Irish descent
American Roman Catholics
American stand-up comedians
Comedians from Illinois
Grammy Award winners
Loyola University Chicago alumni
Loyola University Chicago School of Law alumni
Male actors from Chicago
Mark Twain Prize recipients
Military personnel from Illinois
People from Oak Park, Illinois
Primetime Emmy Award winners
St. Ignatius College Prep alumni
United States Army soldiers
Warner Records artists